Gustavfjellet is a mountain in Nordenskiöld Land at Spitsbergen, Svalbard. It reaches a height of 1,218 m.a.s.l. Nearby glaciers are Livbreen to the west, Ankerbreen to the north, and Sjaktbreen to the east. The mountain is named after mineralogist Gustaf Nordenskiöld.

References

Mountains of Spitsbergen